Malanka (or ) is a Ukrainian folk holiday celebrated on 13 January, which is New Year's Eve in accordance with the 31 December of Julian calendar (see Old New Year).  The festivities were historically centred around a house-to-house visiting by groups in costume as characters from a folk tale of pre-Christian origin, as well as special food and drink.  The context of the rituals has changed, but some elements continue to the present.

Origins, name and regional variations 

The idea of house-to-house visits during the Christmas season is a pan-European one.  Similar customs are observed in Ireland and England as "mummering", in Winterbräuche or Faslam in Germany, etc.  In the West Slavic lands, even more closely related customs are found, with Poles even using many of the same stock characters in their house visiting traditions.

The ritual is derived from a Christianized folk tale of pagan origin. The story is based on the daughter of the creator god Praboh, whose four sons included Veles (demonized as "the Devil"), Yarylo (identified with St. George), Rai (St. John), and Lad or Mir (Peace). His daughter Lada was mother Earth, who had two children: a son called the Moon and a daughter "Spring-May", later referred to as Mylanka because she was loving. In a version of the myth of Hades and Persephone, Mylanka's evil uncle (the Devil) desired her presence in the underworld and abducted her one day when the Moon was hunting. While Mylanka was gone, the Earth lacked the rebirth of spring, and once she was released from the vices of the Devil, flowers began to bloom and greenery spread around the world. Ukrainians celebrate Malanka to symbolize the onset of spring.  Another theory regarding the name of the character Malanka relates it to the Christian saint Melania the Younger, whose feast day is December 31 OS (January 13 NS): New Year's Day.

This holiday is also known as Bounteous Evening in much of Ukraine and Belarus, but this name can also be applied to Theophany Eve in Western Ukraine.  A traditional way of referring to the holidays during the Christmas season in the Eastern Slavic languages is by which recipe of kutia (whole-grain sweetened porridge), the most symbolic ritual food, is used.  A lenten (dairy-fee) version (bahata kutia, "ample kutia") is associated with Christmas Eve, schedra kutia ("generous" or "bountiful" kutia) with the Old New Year's Eve or Malanka, hence "bounteous evening", and a second lenten version ("hungry kutia") for Theophany Eve).

Descriptions of this holiday form the nineteenth century mention the folk play with a character named "Malanka".  They frequently also mention the tradition of driving a goat from house to house to bring good luck.  In some regions of Western Ukraine and in Romania, a live goat is replaced by a dancer in a goat costume.

Ukrainian traditions 

In some villages of Vinnytsia Oblast, on this day they prepare a traditional festive dish of blood sausage, which is also called "malanka". They also bake special breads which are called "Malanka" and "Vasyl"<

On the morning of this day the second ritual kutia is prepared – the "generous" kutia. Unlike the "bahata" kutia on Sviat Vechir (Christmas Eve), it is made with non-Lenten ingredients. As is done on Sviat Vechir, the kutia is placed in the pokuttia – the corner of the house where religious icons are displayed, opposite the pich (stove). In addition, the women bake mlyntsi (pancakes), and make pyrihs and dumplings with cheese, to give as gifts to the carolers and "sowers".

Food is given a very important role: on Malanka, as it is believed that the more variety on the table that day, the more generous next year will be. The dishes should be very satisfying, but, for example, cooking fish is a bad sign, because happiness can "pour" out of the home. Pork dishes are definitely prepared, as this animal symbolizes abundance in the house. Traditionally, pork is prepared as kholodets (meat in aspic), blood and pork sausages, vershchaky (roasted pork marinated in beet kvas), salo (cured slabs of pork fatback), stuffed whole pig, and more.

In the evenings and until midnight, the carolers stroll by the houses of the village. According to ancient tradition, New Year's caroling by the "malankary", like Christmas caroling, occurs after sunset, that is, when evil spirits rule. Teenaged girls, alone or in a group, run around to their neighbors to carol. They are rewarded with food and sweets.

Young men also go about on Malanka. This is called "leading Mаlanka". Young men in masks express good wishes, and amuse with funny songs, dances, and skits. One of them is usually dressed in women's clothing and is called Melanka.

According to custom, after finishing their ritual rounds, the next morning the young men went to a crossroads to burn the "Did" or "Didukh" – a sheaf of grain that had stood in the pokuttia since Sviat Vechir – and then jumped over a bonfire. This was meant to cleanse them after dealing with the evil spirits all night.

The next day, (St. Basil's Day) when it began to grow light, the young men go to "sow grain". The grain is carried in a glove or bag. First they visit their godparents and other relatives and loved ones, then their neighbors. Entering the house, the sower sows grain and greets everyone with the New Year:
I sow, I sow, I sow, I greet you with the New Year!
Good fortune, and good health in the New Year,
May your fields bear better this year than last,
Rye, wheat and any grains,
Hemp piled to the ceiling in large rolls.
Be healthy for the New Year and Basil's Day!
God grant us this!
The first sower to visit on New Year's day brings happiness to the house. According to popular belief, girls do not bring happiness, only boys do, and therefore it is not appropriate for girls to go "sowing".

Malanka celebrations in North America

Among early settlers 
Canadian Folklorist Robert Klymasz identifies the Ukrainian tradition of Malanka as alike to mummering practiced in Britain, Ireland and Newfoundland, but with several differences.  For one thing, Ukrainian Malanka mummerers were typically unmarried and always male and never female and they made a point of visiting houses that had unmarried young women, so the ritual had a function in courtship.  The humour of the ritual came from the fact that the lankiest, most awkward young man was chosen to play the role of Malanka, and then all the song praised Malanka's supposed beauty and grace.  The eligible woman of the house was scrutinized to see to which of the mummerers she gave any gifts of money or food and drink as evidence of who she might like to marry.  According to Klymasz, these house-visits were largely lost after the Second World War, and replaced by a modernized ritual.

Modernized celebrations 
In North America, house visits were largely replaced by Ukrainized versions of a Anglo-North American New Year's Eve ball after the Second Wold War. They typically occur a week after Christmas Eve (Old Calendar), but not necessarily falling on 13 or 14 January; they are usually held on an ensuing Friday or Saturday night.  The characters from the mummery are now presented instead as a skit for an audience.

These "Malanky" are mostly pure modernized recreation, but with enough distinctions to indicate their cultural background. The event would typically include a supper, raffles and door prizes, and end with a zabava (dance). At midnight, once everyone cheers for the New Year, individual and pair polka dancing is stopped and the kolomyika begins. When the kolomyjka is finished, everyone resumes to their previous dancing and continue to party the night away. Malanka is often the last opportunity for partying before the solemn period of Lent which precedes Easter.

References

External links 
 Mercer Report: Ukrainian New Year
 "The roots of tradition in Ukraine's folk holiday Malanka" on The Washington Post

Ukrainian folklore
New Year celebrations
Entertainment in Ukraine
Ukrainian traditions
Russian traditions
Observances in Ukraine
Slavic Christmas traditions
Folk calendar of the East Slavs
January observances
Winter events in Ukraine
Belarusian traditions
Observances in Russia
Observances in Belarus
Cross-dressing
Rituals
Canadian folk culture
Matchmaking
Ukrainian-Canadian culture
Folk plays
Supernatural beings identified with Christian saints